Prince Robert of Luxembourg, Prince of Bourbon-Parma, Prince of Nassau, (Robert Louis François Marie; born 14 August 1968) is a member of the Grand Ducal Family of Luxembourg. He is a paternal first cousin of Henri, the reigning grand duke of Luxembourg. Prince Robert is currently the president of Domaine Clarence Dillon, the French wine company founded by his maternal great-grandfather, Clarence Dillon. As of May 2020, Prince Robert is 12th in the line of succession to the Luxembourger throne.

Early life and family
Born on 14 August 1968 at Fischbach Castle, Fischbach, Luxembourg, he is the second child and only son of Prince Charles of Luxembourg, second son of Charlotte, Grand Duchess of Luxembourg and Prince Felix of Bourbon-Parma, and his American-born wife, Joan Douglas Dillon, second daughter of politician and diplomat C. Douglas Dillon. He has one older sister half-sister from his mother's previous marriage and one older full-sister, Princess Charlotte (born 15 September 1967). Prince Robert and his sister were raised at Fischbach Castle which was then the home of his paternal grandparents.

Prince Robert was educated first at a primary school in Belair before attending Worth School, a Roman Catholic boarding school near Worth, West Sussex, United Kingdom. He studied philosophy and psychology at Georgetown University but left university before graduating to travel through the Middle East and North Africa, India, Nepal, and South America.

On 29 January 1994, Prince Robert married Julie Elizabeth Houston Ongaro (born 9 June 1966) in Boston, Massachusetts. They have three children:
 Princess Charlotte Katherine Justine Marie of Nassau (born 20 March 1995)
 Prince Alexander Théodore Charles Marie of Nassau (born 18 April 1997)
 Prince Frederik Henri Douglas Marie of Nassau (born 18 March 2002)

As their marriage was non-dynastically approved, his wife was initially known only as "Julie de Nassau" and their children initially bore the titles "Count/Countess of Nassau". On 27 November 2004, Grand Duke Henri issued an Arrêté grand-ducal upgrading his wife and their issue to the titles of "Prince/Princess of Nassau" with the style of Royal Highness.

Career
In 1992, Prince Robert and his future wife wrote a screenplay  based on Don Juan. This caught the eye of Steven Spielberg and Creative Artists Agency. He left screenwriting to join the family wine business.

In 1993, Prince Robert joined the board of directors of Domaine Clarence Dillon, the French wine company founded by his maternal great-grandfather, Clarence Dillon, which owns some of the most worldwide prestigious estates including Château Haut-Brion, Château La Mission Haut-Brion and Château Quintus. In 2002, he became general manager. He succeeded his mother, the Duchess of Mouchy and Poix, as president in 2008.

As president, Prince Robert has overseen the creation of one of the largest Saint-Émilion estates and the opening of Restaurant Le Clarence, a two Michelin star restaurant in the 8th arrondissement of Paris, in 2015. In 2018, Prince Robert and  Domaine Clarence Dillon joined the Primum Familiae Vini, an association of family-owned wineries with membership limited to twelve families.

Honours

  Knight Grand Cross of the Order of Adolphe of Nassau (since birth; 14 August 1968)

Ancestry

References

1968 births
Living people
House of Nassau-Weilburg
Luxembourgian princes
Princes of Bourbon-Parma
Princes of Nassau
Luxembourgian Roman Catholics
Luxembourgian businesspeople
Winemakers
People educated at Worth School